Samuel Rohde (1788 – 29 August 1847) was an English first-class cricketer who is recorded in one match in 1812, totalling 2 runs with a highest score of 2 not out. He was educated at Rugby School.

References

Bibliography
 

English cricketers
English cricketers of 1787 to 1825
George Osbaldeston's XI cricketers
1788 births
1847 deaths